Holcosus chaitzami, also known commonly as Chaitzam's ameiva, is a species of lizard in the family Teiidae. The species is native to extreme southern North America and Central America.

Etymology
The specific name, chaitzami, is "dedicated to Chaitzam, the mountain lord who dominates the lower Cahabón Valley".

Geographic range
H. chaitzami is found in Guatemala and in the southernmost Mexican state of Chiapas.

Habitat

Description

Reproduction
H. chaitzami is oviparous.

References

Further reading
Harvey MB, Ugueto GN, Gutberlet RL (2012). "Review of Teiid Morphology with a Revised Taxonomy and Phylogeny of the Teiidae (Lepidosauria: Squamata)". Zootaxa 3459: 1–156. (Holcosus chaitzami, new combination).
Johnson JD, Mata-Silva V, García-Padilla E, Wilson LD (2015). "The Herpetofauna of Chiapas, Mexico: composition, distribution, and conservation". Mesoamerican Herpetology 2 (3): 272–329.
Lee JC (2000). A Field Guide to the Amphibians and Reptiles of the Maya World: The Lowlands of Mexico, Northern Guatemala, and Belize. Ithaca, New York: Comstock Publishing Associates, a Division of Cornell University Press. 416 pp. . (Ameiva chaitzami).
Stuart LC (1942). "Comments on the undulata Group of Ameiva (Sauria)". Proceedings of the Biological Society of Washington 55: 143–150. (Ameiva chaitzami, new species, pp. 143–145).

chaitzami
Reptiles described in 1942
Taxa named by Laurence Cooper Stuart